Opuntia triacantha is a species of cactus known by the common names Spanish lady, Keys Joe-jumper, Big Pine Key prickly-pear, and jumping prickly apple. It is native to the Caribbean, from Desecheo Island, Puerto Rico, to the Lesser Antilles.

This cactus grows prostrate or upright to a maximum length of 60 centimeters. The stem segments are flattened and oval in shape, up to 18 centimeters long by 7 wide. The black-tipped spines are up to 4 centimeters long. The cactus produces yellow flowers year-round. The fleshy red fruit is up to 3 centimeters long by 2 wide.

The cactus grows on the sandy limestone of exposed reefs.

This species is threatened by the cactus moth (Cactoblastis cactorum).

References

triacantha
Cacti of North America
Flora of the Caribbean
Flora of Florida
Flora of Puerto Rico